The Nordic Institute for Interoperability Solutions (NIIS) is a non-profit established in 2017 by Estonia and Finland, with the mission "to develop e-governance solutions...with the X-Road technology used nationwide in the Estonian X-tee and in the Finnish Suomi.fi Data Exchange Layer services". It is funded by both countries, with around 1M€ annually. In 2019, Iceland was invited as well, and later the Faroe Islands.

The NIIS manages, develops, verifies, and audits X-Road's source code; administers documentation, business and technical requirements; conducts development; develops and implements principles of licensing and distribution; provides second-line support for members, and engages in international cooperation. It also shares vendor training and certifications on its technology.

The institute has been coined as "a pioneer of cross-border e-governance solution"  and "a key component of its digital diplomacy and digital foreign policy work", "unique in the world". In 2020, the Digital Public Goods Alliance found the X-Road technology managed by NIIS was found to be a digital public good in alignment with the Digital Public Goods Standard. Its CEO, Ville Sirviö, is often referenced in international publications.

References

External links 

 Main Website

Internet in Estonia
Government agencies of Estonia
Government agencies of Finland
Government agencies of Iceland
Estonia–Finland relations
2017 establishments in Estonia
2017 establishments in Finland
Free and open-source software organizations
Non-profit technology